Jens Zimmermann may refer to:

 Jens Zimmermann (philosopher) (born 1965), philosopher and theologian
 Jens Zimmermann (host) (born 1972), German sport announcer, moderator and athletes manager
 Jens Zimmermann (politician) (born 1981), German politician
 Jens Zimmermann (sport shooter) (born 1967), German sports shooter